Fawn is a light yellowish tan colour. It is usually used in reference to clothing, soft furnishings and bedding, as well as to a dog's coat colour. It occurs in varying shades, ranging between pale tan to pale fawn to dark deer-red.
The first recorded use of fawn as a colour name in English was in 1789.

Fawn in dog breeds
The fawn coat colour is found in many breeds, such as Boxers, Great Danes, Pugs, and,  Puggles.Genetically, in most cases the colour is due to the recessive ay gene at the Agouti locus. Some breeds, such as Chows and Doberman Pinschers use the term "fawn" to describe a red dog (at the Eumelanin locus) that carries a copy of the dilution gene; in Dobermans this colour is more commonly called "Isabella".

See also
 List of colours

Notes

References 
 Web.forret.com Colour Conversion Tool, set to hex code of colour #E5AA70 (Fawn)
 ColorHexa
 #E5AA70
 #E5AA70 Analysis

External links

Shades of brown